Memories of Overdevelopment is a 2010 Cuban film. Written and directed by Miguel Coyula, the story is based on a novel by Edmundo Desnoes, also the author of the 1968 classic Memories of Underdevelopment. This independent film was produced by David Leitner and features Cuban actor, Ron Blair as the lead character. It is the first Cuban dramatic feature film with scenes filmed both in Cuba and the United States. After its world Premiere at the 2010 Sundance Film Festival, it garnered several awards and honors. The International Film Guide described it as one of the best films Cuba has produced.

Plot
Sergio Garcet is an intellectual who abandons the Cuban Revolution and 'underdevelopment' behind only to find himself at odds with the ambiguities of his new life in the 'developed' world.

Highly episodical, the film consists of flashbacks, daydreams, and hallucinations comprising live-action, animation, and newsreel footage assembled to suggest the way personal memory works, subjectively and emotionally.

Production

Production of “Memorias del Desarrollo” took five years, starting in 2005 and completed in 2010, with locations in five countries.  According to Director Miguel Coyula, his first draft of the screenplay was a faithful adaptation of Edmundo Desnoes' novel.  But as he began filming and editing simultaneously, he became aware of new possibilities, which would radically alter the narrative structure of the original novel as well as its characters. The film did not follow the traditional chronology of writing, shooting and editing.  This required a new approach where pre-production, production, and postproduction, no longer needed to exist as distinct elements but rather as an integral interactive seamless process.  This new way of working was not meant as a shortcut, but rather as a way of revealing new narrative layers of the work as it evolved to create the director’s vision.

Coyula would take advantage of everything around him that he thought would add to the film, heavily manipulating images digitally, into the film’s final highly fragmented narrative.  For example, the scenes with the 9/11 footage, which the director had recorded years before; the Paris, London and Tokyo scenes, which were shot while Coyula was travelling invited to film festivals presenting his film Red Cockroaches.  Most of the various location shoots were done without permits, through favors from friends, and with a minimal crew consisting mostly of director Miguel Coyula, producer David W. Leitner and lead actor Ron Blair, easily adapting at a moment’s notice and without the constraints of a rigid schedule. The film's most decisive work however took place in the editing room. In several visual presentations Coyula stated that no shot in the film escaped digital manipulation of some kind, which included, green screen, compositing in recreating sets, double exposures, replacing backgrounds, changing lighting, weather conditions, performing digital art direction, and actors shot in different countries performing together on screen.

Producer David Leitner initially hoped to raise 2 million dollars for the project. But after realizing there was no interest from film production companies neither in North or South America, they reverted to a strategy closer to Coyula's first feature, Red Cockroaches. The film was funded by executive producers Steve Pieczenik, and Suzana Dejkanovic, associate producers Juan Martinez, and Michael Ferris Gibson as well as the Guggenheim Fellowship Coyula was awarded in 2009 for this project. While working on a low budget delayed completion by five years, it also allowed Coyula to have total creative control of the film.

Reception

Memorias del Desarrollo received almost unanimous positive reviews throughout its Film Festival run.  An initial negative review by Variety’s Robert Koehler  after its premiere at Sundance, described the film as  “an unfortunate follow up to Tomas Gutierrez Alea’s masterpiece.”  Subsequently James Greenberg from Hollywood Reporter considered it “Thoughtful and cinematically bold... an affecting portrait of modern man becoming more and more isolated from a world he helped to create.”   Bérénice Reynaud at Senses of Cinema wrote “Coyula ups the ante by over-compositing the image and saturating the colors, creating a complex kaleidoscope, which in turns dictates the editing of the sequences in a kinetic, non-linear way.  Paralleling free association, the structure blurs the lines between actual events, fake memories, projections, irritation at American pop culture, political anger, rambling and resentments… These techniques allow Coyula to further destabilize his character, to create a palpable tension between the film and Desnoes’ text, and to eventually reappropriate (or salvage) his trajectory in exile.”  Latin American Film Scholar Michael Chanan declared it “A dazzling and disconcerting work of great bravado… A paradigm for a new digital cinema beholden to no orthodoxy.”  Cuban writer and critic Orlando Luis Pardo wrote in Diario de Cuba that the film was “A memorable moment in the Cuban Arts”. Cinema Without Border’s critic Robin Menken chose it as the Best Film of 2010. The International Film Guide described it in its 2011 survey as “One of the Best Films Cuba has produced”. However the film remains largely unseen outside of Cuba, due to the lack of a distributor.

Honors
 Best Cuban Film of 2010 by the International Film Guide.
 Chosen among the 10 Best Cuban Films of 2010 by the ACPC (Cuban Association of Cinema Press)
 Best Film of 2010 by Cinema Without Borders

Awards
 Audience Award for Best Foreign Feature Film, Arraial CineFest, Brazil, 2012 
 Best Narrative Feature, Extreme World Cinema Festival San Sebastián de Veracruz, Mexico, 2012 
 Best Director, Latinamerican Territory, Málaga Film Festival, Spain, 2011 
 Cine Latino Award, Washington DC Independent Film Festival, USA, 2011 
 Special Jury Award, Encuentro Nacional de Video, Cuba, 2011
 Special Jury Award, El Almacén de la Imagen, Cuba, 2011
 FIPRESCI Award, Caracol Awards, Cuba, 2011
 Mention, Caracol Awards, Cuba, 2011
 UNEAC Award, Encuentro Nacional de Video, Cuba, 2011
 Best Film, Havana New Filmmakers Film Festival, Cuba, 2011 
 Best Original Music, Havana New Filmmakers Film Festival, Cuba, 2011 
 FIPRESCI Award, Havana New Filmmakers Film Festival, Cuba, 2011 
 SIGNIS Award, Havana New Filmmakers Film Festival, Cuba, 2011 
 Editora Musical Award, Havana New Filmmakers Film Festival, Cuba, 2011 
 Special Award, ACE Awards, USA, 2011 
 Most Innovative, Cero Latitud Film Festival, Ecuador, 2010 
 Best Narrative Feature, Dallas Video Fest, USA, 2010 
 Best Feature, New Media Film Festival, USA, 2010 
 Special Mention, Cine Las Americas International Film Festival, USA, 2010
 Best Film, Havana Film Festival New York, USA, 2010

See also

 Cinema of Cuba

References

External links
 
 "Best Cuban Films of 2010" " . International Film Guide. Abu Dhabi Film Commission.
 Greenberg, James (14 October 2010) "Memories of Overdevelopmen—Film Review", The Hollywood Reporter - review
 Menken, Robin (23 January 2011) "Best Film of 2010, according to CWB's critic, Robin Menken" Cinema Without Borders - review
 Reynaud, Bérénice (11 July 2010) "The Image and its Discontent". Senses of Cinema, Issue 55. - review

Cuban drama films
Existentialist films
Film
Films about immigration to the United States
Films about the Cuban Revolution
Cultural depictions of Fidel Castro
Cultural depictions of Che Guevara
2010 films
2010s Spanish-language films